Sir William Atkinson   (born 9 April 1950) is a Jamaican-born British head teacher who 'turned around' Phoenix High School, a secondary school near White City, London. He also contributed to Channel 4's The Unteachables, and was the inspiration behind Lenny Henry's character in the 1999 BBC TV series Hope and Glory. He is a graduate of King's College London (MA, 1980)
he also helped students with their lives.

References

1950 births
Living people
Alumni of King's College London
Deputy Lieutenants of Greater London
Heads of schools in London
Knights Bachelor